The South Sydney Development Corporation was an agency of the NSW Government operating from 1996 until its abolition in 2005.

History
The organisation was responsible for promoting, coordinating and managing the development of the former industrial area around Green Square, New South Wales.

References

Development corporations in Australia
Government agencies of New South Wales
Government agencies established in 1996
Government agencies disestablished in 2005
1996 establishments in Australia
2005 disestablishments in Australia
Urban development authorities